Nanpo Shōmyō (Japanese: なんぽしょうみょう, Kanji: 南浦紹明; 1235 – 9 February 1309) is a Japanese Zen monk of Rinzai school during the Kamakura period. Although his exact origin is unknown, he is from Inomiya village, Abe District, Shizuoka (now Inomiya-chō, Aoi-ku, Shizuoka). Shōmyō  is his true name (also "Jyōmin"), Nampo is his Dharma name. His imperial name is the Entsū Daiō Kokushi.

Life 
Nanpo Shōmyō grew up and studied at his hometown's temple, Takyō-ji. In 1249 he began studying Zen under Lanxi Daolong at Kenchō-ji. In 1259 he traveled to Song China and inherited the law from the monk Kidō Chigu. In 1267 he returned to Japan and Kenchō-ji, staying until 1270, when he moved Kōtoku-ji in Chikuzen Province. In 1272 years he became the chief priest at Sōfuku-ji. In 1304, at the invitation of Emperor Go-Uda, he entered Manju-ji. In 1307 he returned to Kenchō-ji. He died at the age of 75 in 1309. He was the master of Kyōō Unryō and Shūhō Hyōchō.

In December 1309, Emperor Go-Uda awarded him the Kokushi name of "Entsū Daiō", which is the beginning of Zen monks receiving the Kokushi name in Japan. Following him, Shūhō Hyōchō received Daitō Kokushi and then Kanzan Egen received Muso Daishi. The names of the three monks formed the Ōtōkan lineage.

Historical landmark 
Nanpo Shōmyō's birthplace in now Inomiya-chō, Aoi-ku, Shizuokain Shoichi has a hot water well that is now a Cultural Property of Shizuoka City known as "Daiō Kokushi Well".

Biography 
 Araki, Kengo 荒木見悟, (1994). Daiō : Goroku. Tōkyō: Kōdansha.

References 

1235 births
1309 deaths
Japanese Zen Buddhists
Kamakura period Buddhist clergy
Rinzai Buddhists